The 2018 Sochi FIA Formula 2 round was a pair of motor races held on 29 and 30 September 2018 at the Sochi Autodrom in Sochi, Russia as part of the FIA Formula 2 Championship. It was the eleventh round of the 2018 FIA Formula 2 Championship and was run in support of the 2018 Russian Grand Prix.

Classifications

Qualifying

Feature Race 

Notes
 – Roberto Merhi originally finished 8th but received a five-second time penalty for leaving the track and gaining an advantage.
 – Louis Delétraz originally finished 9th but received a ten-second time penalty for crossing the pit entry line and a five-second time penalty for leaving the track and gaining an advantage.

Sprint Race

Championship standings after the round

Drivers' Championship standings

Teams' Championship standings

References

External links 
 

Sochi
Formula 2
Formula 2